Jaltomata is a genus of plants in the family Solanaceae. According to molecular phylogenies, Jaltomata is the sister genus to Solanum, which includes tomato, potato, and eggplant. Jaltomata has a neotropical distribution, in that species occur from the United States southwest through Latin America, and into the Andean region of South America. Species encompass a wide range of vegetative and reproductive trait variation, including growth habit (trailing herbs, erect herbs, and woody shrubs), floral size, shape and color, as well as fruit size and color. The fruits of some of the species are eaten by humans in Latin and South America. Depending on the species, fruits may be red, green, orange, or dark purple.

Etymology
The name comes from xāltomatl, lit. "sand tomato", the Nahuatl (Aztec) name for the species Jaltomata procumbens (earlier Saracha jaltomata). The Nahuatl X is pronounced like an English SH, but when borrowed into Mexican Spanish and spelled J, the pronunciation is like an English H. Both Mexican and US American botanists pronounce the J this way.

Species
Currently accepted species:

Jaltomata andersonii  T. Mione
Jaltomata antillana (Krug & Urb.) D'Arcy
Jaltomata aspera (Ruiz & Pav.) T. Mione & F. G. Coe
Jaltomata atiquipa Mione & S. Leiva G.
Jaltomata auriculata (Miers) Mione
Jaltomata aypatensis S. Leiva, Mione & Quipuscoa
Jaltomata bernardelloana S. Leiva & Mione
Jaltomata bicolor (Ruiz & Pav.) Mione
Jaltomata biflora (Ruiz & Pav.) Benítez
Jaltomata bohsiana Mione & D.M. Spooner
Jaltomata cajacayensis  S. Leiva & T. Mione
Jaltomata cajamarca  T. Mione
Jaltomata calliantha  S. Leiva & T. Mione
Jaltomata chihuahuensis (Bitter) Mione & Bye
Jaltomata confinis (C.V. Morton) J.L. Gentry
Jaltomata contorta (Ruiz & Pav.) Mione
Jaltomata cuyasensis S. Leiva, Quipuscoa & Sawyer
Jaltomata dendroidea S. Leiva & Mione
Jaltomata dentata (Ruiz & Pav.) Benitez
Jaltomata diversa (J.F. Macbr.) Mione
Jaltomata grandiflora (B.L. Rob. & Greenm.) D'Arcy, Mione & Davis 	
Jaltomata grandibaccata   S. Leiva & Mione 	
Jaltomata herrerae (C.V. Morton) Mione
Jaltomata incahuasina Mione & S. Leiva
Jaltomata leivae Mione
Jaltomata lezamae S. Leiva & Mione
Jaltomata lojae Mione
Jaltomata mionei S. Leiva & Quipuscoa
Jaltomata neei Mione & S. Leiva
Jaltomata nigricolor S. Leiva & Mione
Jaltomata nitida (Bitter) Mione
Jaltomata paneroi Mione & S. Leiva
Jaltomata procumbens (Cav.) J.L.Gentry
Jaltomata propinqua (Miers) Mione & M. Nee
Jaltomata quipuscoae Mione & S. Leiva
Jaltomata repandidentata (Dunal) Hunz.
Jaltomata sagastegui Mione
Jaltomata salpoensis S. Leiva & Mione
Jaltomata sanctae-martae Benitez
Jaltomata sinuosa (Miers) Mione
Jaltomata umbellata (Ruiz & Pav.) Mione & M. Nee
Jaltomata ventricosa (Baker) Mione
Jaltomata viridiflora (Kunth) M. Nee & Mione
Jaltomata weberbaueri (Dammer) T. Mione & F. G. Coe
Jaltomata werffii D'Arcy
Jaltomata yacheri  Mione & S. Leiva
Jaltomata yungayensis Mione & S. Leiva

References

 
Solanaceae genera
Edible plants